Oribotritiidae is a family of mites in the order Oribatida.

Genera
 Oribotritia

References

Sarcoptiformes
Acari families